Tsai Chih-chieh is a Taiwanese football player. He currently serves in Taiwanese military service and plays for the Taiwan National Sports Training Center football team.

He played for the Chinese Taipei national futsal team at the 2004 FIFA Futsal World Championship finals.

References

1982 births
Living people
Taiwanese footballers
Taiwanese men's futsal players
Association football midfielders